Gregorio Walerstein Weinstock (22 February 1913 – 24 January 2002) was a Mexican film producer and screenwriter of Jewish descent. He produced 193 films between 1941 and 1989. His productions include Ash Wednesday (1958), which was entered into the 8th Berlin International Film Festival, and La Valentina (1966), his last collaboration with actress María Félix. He also discovered actresses Flor Silvestre, Ofelia Montesco, and Hilda Aguirre.

Selected filmography

 The Count of Monte Cristo (1942)
 My Memories of Mexico (1944)
 The Two Orphans (1944)
 Everybody's Woman (1946)
 The Thief (1947)
 The Private Life of Mark Antony and Cleopatra (1947)
 Maclovia (1948)
 Midnight (1949)
 The Perez Family (1949)
 The Devil Is a Woman (1950)
 Primero soy mexicano (1950)
 A Galician Dances the Mambo (1951)
 María Montecristo (1951)
 Now I Am Rich (1952)
 A Place Near Heaven (1952)
 The Island of Women (1953)
 You've Got Me By the Wing (1953)
 Las Tres perfectas casadas (1953)
 Camelia (1954)
 Un extraño en la escalera (1955)
 Ash Wednesday (1958)
 La fièvre monte à El Pao (1959)
 Young People (1961)
 La Valentina (1966)
 The Bricklayer (1975)
 Spicy Chile (1983)

References

External links

1913 births
2002 deaths
Jewish writers
Mexican film producers
Writers from Mexico City
Mexican Jews
Golden Ariel Award winners
20th-century Mexican screenwriters
20th-century Mexican male writers